Accel World is a 2012 Sci-Fi Japanese anime television series based on the light novel series written by Reki Kawahara and illustrated by HiMA. The anime is produced by Sunrise and directed by Masakazu Obara with screenplay by Hiroyuki Yoshino.

Set in the year 2046, Neuro-Synchronization allows humans to virtually manipulate their five senses, where people can access the internet and enter virtual worlds via Neuro-Linkers. The series follows Haruyuki "Haru" Arita, a short, fat boy who has low self-esteem due to being bullied at school which Haru vents his frustrations in virtual world games. Haruyuki soon gets the attention of Kuroyukihime, the Student Council Vice-President who invites him into the "Accelerated World" called Brain Burst, a program that allows users to make time appear to stand still in their surroundings by "accelerating" their brainwaves in the real world. But in order to gain more points to accelerate, Brain Burst users fight each other in a virtual reality massive multiplayer online (VRMMO) fighting game where losing all of your points means you can never use Brain Burst again. Grateful for helping him, Haruyuki vows to help Kuroyukihime defeat the "Six Kings of Color", the leaders of the most powerful factions in Brain Burst and obtain Level 10 to ultimately learn why the "Accelerated World" was created.

The anime's first two episodes pre-aired on Nico Nico Douga and officially aired in Japan on Tokyo MX and TV Saitama between April 7, 2012, and September 22, 2012. The series is licensed in North America by Viz Media, who simulcasted the series on Hulu and later began streaming an English-dubbed version on its Neon Alley service from April 19, 2013. For episodes 1–13, the opening theme song is "Chase the world" by May'n and the ending theme song is "unfinished" by KOTOKO feat. FripSide. An original video animation episode was released with the PlayStation 3 and PlayStation Portable video game, Accel World: Ginyoku no Kakusei, on September 13, 2012, with another OVA released with the second game, Accel World: Kasoku no Chōten, on January 31, 2013.

Episode list

OVAs
The following original video animation episodes are included with the video games Accel World: Ginyoku no Kakusei and Accel World: Kasoku no Chōten, released by Namco Bandai Games. The PlayStation 3 versions of the games feature the episode in Blu-ray Disc format, whilst the PlayStation Portable versions include the episode on DVD.

Achel World
The following bonus episodes tentatively titled Achel World are included on BD/DVD volumes of the series.

References

External links
  
 Official game website 

Accel World